John Steppling (8 August 1870 in Essen, Germany – 5 April 1932 in Hollywood, California) was a German-American silent film actor. 
 
He moved to America at a young age and entered film in 1912 aged 42. He starred in a total of 230 films between then and 1928. He is also credited with directing 7 films.

He is the grandfather of playwright John Steppling.

Selected filmography

 Tess of the d'Urbervilles (1913)
 Caprice (1913)
 When a Woman Waits (1914)
 The Beggar Child (1914)
 The Archeologist (1914)
 A Slice of Life (1914)
 The Final Impulse (1914)
 Damaged Goods (1914)
 This Is th' Life (1914)
 The Butterfly (1914)
 The Lure of the Sawdust (1914)
 The Resolve (1915)
 The Promise (1917) 
 A Man's Man (1918)
 The Guilty Man (1918)
 Good Night, Paul (1918)
 The Road Through the Dark (1918)
 Fools and Their Money (1919)
 Luck in Pawn (1919)
 Sick Abed (1920)
 Number 99 (1920)
 Live Sparks (1920)
 Madame Peacock (1920)
 Billions (1920)
 Black Beauty (1921)
 The Silver Car (1921)
 Garments of Truth (1921)
Nobody's Kid (1921)
 The Hunch (1921)
 Extra! Extra! (1922)
 Too Much Business (1922)
 Confidence (1922)
 Glass Houses (1922)
 Bell Boy 13 (1923)
 Going Up (1923)
 Let's Go (1923)
 The Man Next Door (1923)
 A Cafe in Cairo (1924)
 The Reckless Age (1924)
 Fools in the Dark (1924)
 The Breathless Moment (1924)
 The Dramatic Life of Abraham Lincoln (1924)
 Soft Shoes (1925)
 California Straight Ahead (1925)
 Eve's Lover (1925)
 Collegiate (1926)
 The Better Man (1926)
 Memory Lane (1926)
 By Whose Hand? (1927)
 Her Father Said No (1927)
 California or Bust (1927)
 Wedding Bills (1927)
 God's Great Wilderness (1927)

External links

 

1932 deaths
1870 births
American male film actors
American male silent film actors
German emigrants to the United States
20th-century American male actors